Hēnare Mātene Te Whiwhi (?–1881) was a notable New Zealand tribal leader, missionary and assessor. Of Māori descent, he identified with the Ngati Raukawa and Ngati Toa iwi. Being sometimes called Te Whiwhi-o-te-rangi, his mother's name was Rangi Topeora. The name Hēnare Mātene came after his baptism in 1843. Combining the names, his most common title became Mātene Te Whiwhi.
His death was on the 28th of September, 1881. In 1840, te whiwhi signed the treaty of waitangi.

References

1881 deaths
New Zealand Anglican missionaries
New Zealand Māori religious leaders
Ngāti Raukawa people
Ngāti Toa people
Signatories of the Treaty of Waitangi
Year of birth unknown
Anglican missionaries in New Zealand